Line 26 is a future subway line on the Shanghai Metro. The line was announced by the Municipal government in 2016.
 It will run in a loop and be Shanghai Metro's second loop line.

Stations

Service routes

References

Shanghai Metro lines
Proposed buildings and structures in Shanghai
Shanghai
2025 in rail transport
Railway loop lines